Airports of the World is a bi-monthly magazine which looks at the people and companies that make up many of the world's airports. The headquarters is in Stamford, Lincolnshire.

History and profile
The first issue of Airports of the Magazine was released in October 2005. The magazine is published in the United Kingdom by Key Publishing and available worldwide. It is also available on iOS in Newsstand.

Each issue of the magazine contains six or more feature articles, reports on the latest airport products and infrastructure, explanation of common airport abbreviations and reports from recent airport events.

References

External links

2005 establishments in the United Kingdom
Aviation magazines
Bi-monthly magazines published in the United Kingdom
Magazines established in 2005
Mass media in Lincolnshire
Transport magazines published in the United Kingdom